Phalonidia aliena is a species of moth of the family Tortricidae. It is found in China (Liaoning), Japan, Korea and the Russian Far East.

The wingspan is about 11 mm.

Taxonomy
The species was previously treated as a synonym of Phalonidia albipalpana.

References

Moths described in 1966
Phalonidia